Timo Pasi Petteri Heinonen (born 15 February 1975 in Loppi) is a Finnish politician currently serving in the Parliament of Finland for the National Coalition Party at the Tavastia constituency.

References

1975 births
Living people
People from Loppi
National Coalition Party politicians
Members of the Parliament of Finland (2007–11)
Members of the Parliament of Finland (2011–15)
Members of the Parliament of Finland (2015–19)
Members of the Parliament of Finland (2019–23)